Bela Vista is a station on the Red Line of the Lisbon Metro. The station is located in at Av. Francisco Salgado Zenha, close to Bela Vista Park and Pingo Doce da Bela Vista Shopping Mall.

History
The architectural design is by Paulo Brito da Silva with installation art by plastic artist and ceramicist Querubim Lapa.

Connections

Urban buses

Carris 
 793 Marvila ⇄ Estação Roma-Areeiro
 794 Terreiro do Paço ⇄ Estação Oriente (Interface)

See also
 List of Lisbon metro stations

References

External links

Red Line (Lisbon Metro) stations
Railway stations opened in 1998#